Jessey is both a surname and given name. It may be a variant of Jesse as a given name. Notable people with the name include:

Fred Jessey (born 1977), Nigerian freestyle wrestler
Henry Jessey (1603–1663), English Dissenter
Jessey Voorn (born 1990), Dutch basketball player
Jessey Wade ( – 1952), English suffragette and animal welfare campaigner

See also
 Jesse
 Jessie
 Jessee